Bystander Revolution is an anti-bullying organization founded in 2014 by billionaire and author MacKenzie Scott, which offers advice about simple things individuals can do to defuse bullying. Its website is an online resource that includes hundreds of unscripted videos featuring celebrities, students, experts, and others talking about their personal experiences with bullying.

Bystander Revolution provides crowdsourced solutions to bullying and suggested actions bystanders can take when they see bullying, as well as free multimedia lessons on anti-bullying topics for educators.

Ambassadors

Celebrity Ambassadors

Actor Lily Collins became Bystander Revolution's first ambassador in 2014.

The organization announced on June 8, 2015 that Monica Lewinsky had joined the organization as an ambassador and strategic advisor following her speeches for TED and the Forbes Under 30 Summit.

Youth Ambassador Program

The Youth Ambassador Program is a select group of student leaders who help Bystander Revolution reflect a youthful perspective and remain relatable and helpful for students. In addition to providing feedback and advice, the Youth Ambassadors promote the organization's social media initiatives.

Notable Youth Ambassadors include Hannah Alper, a motivational speaker, blogger, and activist; Carleigh O'Connell, whose story about standing up to her body shaming bullies went viral in 2014; and Shereen Pimentel, who was crowned Miss America's Outstanding Teen (New Jersey) in 2015 with the anti-bullying platform "Words Hurt, Erase the Hate".

Events

On April 23, 2015, Bystander Revolution was featured at We Day Seattle 2015. Ambassador Lily Collins delivered a speech to the KeyArena audience about the power of consistent, simple actions to effect change and shift the culture of bullying toward kindness.

Coinciding with We Day Seattle 2015, Bystander Revolution launched a Twitter campaign called #standkind, a challenge to spread kindness on social media in the form of compliments.

On May 23, 2015, Bystander Revolution teamed up with Dance Free Movement for an event in honor of "Dancing Man" Sean O'Brien who received an outpouring of support after being shamed on the internet for being overweight. Moby deejayed the event, Pharrell Williams initiated a dance flash mob, Tatyana Ali served as the host, and presenters included Monica Lewinsky and Andrew W.K.

For National Bullying Prevention Month in October 2015, Bystander Revolution introduced Month of Action, a 31-day campaign inspiring individuals to help defuse bullying with simple, daily challenges. Each challenge was hosted by a Bystander Revolution ambassador, contributor, or partner organization. Lewinsky, Collins, Salma Hayek, Olivia Wilde, Shonda Rhimes, Rashida Jones, Bradley Cooper, Lizzie Velasquez, Moby, Alan Cumming, Emmy Rossum, Tyson Chandler, Andy Cohen, Jamie Lee Curtis, Michael J. Fox, Drew Lynch, and Melissa Joan Hart hosted daily challenges.

Crowdsourced solutions
Bystander Revolution is modeled on the idea that peer-to-peer advice can be uniquely encouraging and helpful for individuals seeking solutions to bullying. For this reason, the advice and resources compiled on its site were acquired by crowdsourcing the advice presented in the 300+ videos on the website, along with contributions from advisors.

Anti-bullying solutions and tips are also crowdsourced from the organization's partners, including Common Sense Media, MTV's Look Different, No Bully, and PACER's National Bullying Prevention center.

Partners

Various non-profit organizations, corporations, and government entities have partnered with Bystander Revolution, including:

Common Sense Media
Crisis Text Line
We Day
The White House Initiative on Asian Americans and Pacific Islanders
The Bully Project
GLAAD
The Sikh Coalition
IMDb
The Heroic Imagination Project
Craftivist Collective
The Tyler Clementi Foundation
PACER's National Bullying Prevention Center
No Bully
MTV's Look Different
Anti-Bullying Pro (UK)
P.S.-I Made This...
Community Matters
Tarte Cosmetics
Twitter for Good
Dance Free Movement
Safer Internet Day (USA)

Advisors
Experts who advised the organization on the creation of its web platform include:
 Gavin de Becker, expert on the prediction and management of violence
 Philip Zimbardo, Professor Emeritus of Psychology at Stanford University
 Dorothy Espelage, Professor of Child Development in the Department of Educational Psychology at the University of Illinois, Urbana-Champaign
 Nicholas Carlisle, Founder and CEO of No Bully
 James McGee, author of The Classroom Avenger, the first forensic study of rampage school shooting incidents across the United States
 Richard Lieberman, coordinator of the Suicide Prevention Services of Los Angeles Unified School District 
 Roxana Marachi, Associate Professor of Education in the Lurie College of Education at San Jose State University

See also
 Bullying
 Cyberbullying
 National Bullying Prevention Month

References

External links
 
 
 Bystander Revolution on YouTube
 Bystander Revolution on Facebook
 What Can One Person Do To Help? (video)

Anti-bullying campaigns
Anti-bullying organizations in the United States
2010s YouTube series
American non-fiction web series
2014 establishments in Washington (state)
Organizations established in 2014
Companies based in Seattle
Articles containing video clips
Suicide prevention
Anti-homophobia